A glacier is a geological formation of ice.

Glacier may also refer to:

Places

Canada
 Glacier, British Columbia, a railway whistlestop and locality in the Rogers Pass, British Columbia
 Glacier National Park (Canada), British Columbia
 Glacier Pass, a pass on Ellesmere Island, Nunavut
 Glacier Peak (Canadian Rockies), a mountain on the Alberta-British Columbia border in Kootenay National Park
 Glacier Pikes, a volcano in British Columbia

United States
 Glacier, Washington, a census-designated place in Whatcom County, Washington
 Glacier Bay, southeastern Alaska
 Glacier County, Montana, northwestern Montana, adjacent to the US-Canada border
 Glacier National Park (U.S.), Montana
 Glacier Peak, a mountain in the North Cascades of Washington
 Glacier View, Alaska, a census-designated place in the Matanuska-Susitna Borough

Elsewhere
 Gletscherland (Glacier Land), Greenland

Arts, entertainment and music
 Glacier (dance work), a 2013 contemporary dance work by New York choreographer Liz Gerring
 The Glacier, student newspaper of Moraine Valley Community College
 Glacier (wrestler) (born 1964), name Ray Lloyd, American martial artist, professional wrestler, and actor
 Glacier (game engine), game engine by Danish video game developer IO Interactive

Music
 Glacier (band), a Japanese rock band
 "Glacier", a song by John Grant from the 2013 album Pale Green Ghosts
 Glaciers (album), a 2013 album by Blue Sky Black Death

Science and technology
 GLACIER (refrigerator), an ultra-cold freezer used on the International Space Station
 Amazon Glacier, a cloud archiving service

Other uses
 Central Mountain Air (airline call sign: GLACIER)
 USS Glacier, a former icebreaker of the US Navy and Coast Guard (AGB-4 and WAGB-4)
 Fox's Glacier Mints, a brand of mint-flavoured sweets (candy; lollies)

See also
 "Glacial" (short story)
 Glacial period, an interval of time (thousands of years) within an ice age
 Glaisher, a surname
 Ice age (disambiguation)
 Iceberg (disambiguation)
 Glacia (disambiguation)
 List of glaciers